Zunairah al-Rumiya (Zaneerah the Roman) (other transliterations include Zaneera, Zannirah, Zanira or in some sources Zinra or Zinnirah) was a companion of the  Islamic prophet Muhammad. She was among the slaves freed by Abu Bakr.

Biography

Zunairah was a concubine of the Banu Makhzum and a slave of Umar ibn al-Hashim .

She was amongst the first to embrace Islam in Mecca. After her conversion, she was asked to renounce her new religion but remained steadfast. When Abu Jahl knew of her conversion, he beat her.

Abu Bakr bought and freed her, along with her companion in slavery Lubaynah.

After being manumitted, Zunairah lost her eyesight. The Quraysh claimed, "Al-lāt and Al-‘Uzzá are the ones that have taken away her sight." But she replied, "No, by the house of Allah, you are lying. Al-Lat and Al-Uzza can neither harm nor heal and they have not afflicted me. This is from Allah."

Later she recovered her eyesight, a healing that the Muslims attributed to Allah. However, the Quraysh then said, "This is some of Muhammad's magic."

See also
Sahaba
List of non-Arab Sahaba
Sunni view of the Sahaba

References

External links
 Biodata at MuslimScholars.info
 "زنيرة الرومية"

Women companions of the Prophet
Non-Arab companions of the Prophet
Arabian slaves and freedmen